The Oklahoma Secretary of Veterans Affairs is a member of the Oklahoma Governor's Cabinet. The Secretary is appointed by the Governor, with the consent of the Oklahoma Senate, to serve at the pleasure of the Governor. The Secretary serves as the chief advisor to the Governor on veterans healthcare and benefits.

The current Secretary is Major General Ben T. Robinson, USAF (ret.).

History
The position of Secretary of Veterans Affairs was established in 1986 to provide greater oversight and coordination to the energy activities of the State government. The position was established, along with the Oklahoma State Cabinet, by the Executive Branch Reform Act of 1986. The Act directed the Secretary of Veterans Affairs to advise the Governor on policies and operations of the Oklahoma Department of Veterans Affairs.

Unlike any other Cabinet Secretary, the Secretary of Veterans Affairs is the only Cabinet position to have statutory requirements in order for an individual to hold that office. Under Oklahoma state law, any person the Governor appoints to serve as the Secretary must be an honorably discharged veteran and be eligible to receive benefits from the United States Department of Veterans Affairs.

Oklahoma state law always for Cabinet Secretaries to serve concurrently as the head of a State agency in addition to their duties as a Cabinet Secretary. Historically, the Secretary of Veterans Affairs has never served in any such dual position.

Responsibilities
The Secretary of Veterans Affairs is responsible for overseeing the provision of financial assistance, vocational rehabilitation, survivors' benefits, medical benefits and burial benefits to all honorably discharged veterans of the United States military or their dependants or survivors.

As of fiscal year 2011, the Secretary of Veterans Affairs oversees 1998 full-time employees and is responsible for annual budget of over $130 million.

Salary
The annual salary of the Secretary of Veterans Affairs is set by state law at $65,000.

List of Secretaries

See also
United States Department of Veterans Affairs

References

External links
Office of the Secretary of Veterans Affairs website

Veterans Affairs
Veterans Affairs